Aleksandr Anatolyevich Petukhov (born 11 January 1985) is a Kazakh professional footballer who plays as a goalkeeper, most recently for FC Tobol.

Career
Born in Dzhezkazgan (now Jezkazgan), Petukhov began playing football with local side FC Atyrau. In 2003, he moved to Russia where he signed for FC Rubin Kazan. He played for Rubin's reserve and second teams from 2003 to 2006, including a brief stint as a left-back in 2004.

After returning from Russia, Petukhov joined Tobol where he has been the club's starting goalkeeper. He has appeared for the club in the UEFA Europa League qualifying rounds and was voted by the fans the club's best player in April 2010. He signed a one-year contract extension with Tobol in January 2014.

Petukhov has played for the Kazakhstan youth national team. He has been called up to the senior national team, but has never appeared in a competitive international.

Petukhov left FC Tobol in December 2016.

Club career statistics
Last update: 8 November 2010

Honours 
with Tobol
 Intertoto Cup Winner: 2007
 Kazakhstan League Champion: 2010
 Kazakhstan League Runner-up: 2007, 2008
 Kazakhstan Cup Winner: 2007

References

External links
Profile at KLISF

Living people
1985 births
Kazakhstani people of Russian descent
Kazakhstani footballers
Association football goalkeepers
Kazakhstan Premier League players
FC Atyrau players
FC Tobol players
FC Rubin Kazan players